Sandra Ortega Mera (born 19 July 1968) is a Spanish billionaire heiress, businesswoman and socialite.

Mera is the daughter of Amancio Ortega Gaona, and his first wife Rosalia Mera founder of Inditex, best known as the parent company of global fashion empire Zara, she is the richest woman in Spain and  one of the wealthiest people in the world.

Career and personal life
Mera inherited a 7% stake in Inditex, from her mother Rosalie, after she died in 2013, as her brother Marcos was born with cerebral palsy, and became Spain's richest woman with a net worth of $7.3 billion.

Mera owns a share in Pharmaceutical company PharmaMar.

Ortega spends time working with the foundation her mother founded for those with mental and physical disabilities, Fundación Paideia Galiza.

Ortega earned a degree in psychology from the University of Santiago de Compostela. She is married with three children and resides in A Coruña, Spain.

References

1968 births
Living people
20th-century Spanish businesswomen
20th-century Spanish businesspeople
Female billionaires
Spanish billionaires
People from A Coruña
21st-century Spanish businesswomen
21st-century Spanish businesspeople
University of Santiago de Compostela alumni
Businesspeople from Galicia (Spain)
Spanish socialites